Mestoklema is a genus of flowering plants belonging to the family Aizoaceae.

Its native range is Southern Africa.

Species
Species:

Mestoklema albanicum 
Mestoklema arboriforme 
Mestoklema copiosum 
Mestoklema elatum 
Mestoklema illepidum 
Mestoklema tuberosum

References

Aizoaceae
Aizoaceae genera
Taxa named by N. E. Brown